Jan Lynn Stephenson (born 22 December 1951) is an Australian professional golfer. She became a member of the LPGA Tour in 1974 and won three major championships and 16 LPGA Tour events. She has 41 worldwide victories including (10) LPGA Legends Tour wins and 8 worldwide major championships. She has 15 holes-in-one with (9) in competition. She was elected to the World Golf Hall of Fame, class of 2019.

Early life and amateur career
Stephenson was born on 22 December 1951 in Sydney. While a teenager, she won five consecutive New South Wales Schoolgirl Championships in Australia, beginning in 1964, and followed that up with three straight wins in the New South Wales Junior Championship.

Professional career

Stephenson turned professional in 1973 and won the Wills Australian Ladies Open that year. She joined the LPGA Tour in 1974 and was named LPGA Rookie of the Year.

Stephenson's first LPGA victory was the 1976 Sarah Coventry Naples Classic. Her most productive period was the early 1980s, when she won all of her majors in consecutive years: 1981 Peter Jackson Classic, the 1982 LPGA Championship and the 1983 U.S. Women's Open.

Stephenson was one of the first LPGA stars to openly embrace and champion a sex-sells approach to marketing. Stephenson became as famous for her sex appeal as her golf during the early to mid-1980s, when she posed in a bathtub – covered up only by the golf balls filling the tub – and later in a pinup calendar. She urged the LPGA Tour to fully embrace her approach to marketing.

On the golf course, Stephenson won three times each in 1981, 1983 and 1987, those wins in 1987 being her final ones on the LPGA. Stephenson continued playing LPGA events throughout the 1990s, but was hampered by an injury incurred during a mugging in Miami in 1990. Her left ring finger was broken in two places, an injury that still bothers her play in cold or wet weather.

Stephenson went on to win on the Women's Senior Golf Tour, a tour she helped found. In 2003, she became the first woman to play on the Champions Tour at the Turtle Bay Championship, where she finished in last place. Stephenson is among the few women in the course design business, and produced an exercise video for people with arthritis. Her many charitable efforts include being an honorary chairman of the National Multiple Sclerosis Society.

Stephenson was inducted into the Sport Australia Hall of Fame in 1985. She  was a contestant in the 2011 season of Dancing with the Stars on Channel Seven.

Stephenson is an Ambassador for blind and disabled golf through ISPS Handa and has acquired Tarpon Woods Golf Club in Palm Harbor through her Foundation (Jan Stephenson's Crossroads Foundation) www.jscrossroads.com. The golf course provides initiatives for blind/disabled and wounded veterans and first responders. Her mission is, "Giving to Those that have Given so Much". She has been recognised for her philanthropic work by the Government of Australia and other charitable organisations. She was awarded recognition by the Military Order of the Purple Heart in October 2017 for her service to combat wounded/disabled/blind veterans and first responders. Her Foundation was awarded the Charity of the Year by the Palm Harbor Chamber of Commerce in September 2018.

In the 2018 Australia Day Honours, Stephenson was awarded a Medal of the Order of Australia (OAM) ‘for service to golf, and to not-for-profit organisations’.

Controversy
Stephenson made a controversial remark in 2003 when she said "Asians are killing the (LPGA) Tour", referring to the large number of Korean-born players who were winning on tour, and calling for quotas on international players – although she was also an international player she believed that the LPGA should focus on American players. She later apologised, saying that she "did not intend to make it a racial issue."

Professional wins (27)

LPGA Tour (16)

LPGA Tour playoff record (0–4)

ALPG Tour (2)
1973 (1) Wills Australian Ladies Open
1977 (1) Wills Qantas Australian Ladies Open

Ladies European Tour (1)
1985 (1) Hennessy Cognac Ladies Cup

LPGA of Japan Tour (2) 
1981 (1) World Ladies
1985 (1) Nichirei Ladies Cup

Legends Tour (4)
2000 HyVee Classic
2005 BJ's Charity Championship	(with Cindy Rarick; tie with Pat Bradley and Patty Sheehan)
2007 Handa Australia Cup
2021 BJ's Charity Championship (with Laura Diaz)

Other (2)
1983 JCPenney Mixed Team Classic (with Fred Couples)
1990 JCPenney/LPGA Skins Game

Major championships

Wins (3)

Team appearances
Amateur
Tasman Cup (representing Australia): 1970 (winners)

Professional
Handa Cup (representing World team): 2006, 2007, 2008, 2009, 2010, 2012 (tie), 2013 (winners), 2015

See also
List of golfers with most LPGA Tour wins
List of golfers with most LPGA major championship wins

References

External links

Australian female golfers
ALPG Tour golfers
LPGA Tour golfers
Winners of LPGA major golf championships
World Golf Hall of Fame inductees
Sport Australia Hall of Fame inductees
Golfers from Sydney
Sportswomen from New South Wales
People from New Port Richey, Florida
1951 births
Living people